Kalariyullathil  is located in India between Chekkotti Bazar and Koyilothu Thazhe, Thodannure in Thiruvallur panchayat in Kottapally village. It falls under Vatakara Taluk in Kozhikode district [also known as Calicut] which is among the 3 metropolitan cities of Kerala state. The Kalariyullathil territory is a 6 km drive from Vatakara town in the east direction by the Kerala Tourist Highway.

History
Kalariyullathil was the famous ground of Kalarippayattu, an ancient form of martial arts for which Vatakara is well known. The Kalariyullathil land was frequently used for training and for hiding in guerrilla warfare by the famous lions of kalaripayattu, the late Kadathanad after whom vatakara was earlier called] and Kunjali Marakkar. They were the patrons of freedom struggle of Malabar Kerala from Vatakara.

Transportation
Kalariyullathil village connects to other parts of India through Vatakara city on the west and Kuttiady town on the east.  National highway No.66 passes through Vatakara and the northern stretch connects to Mangalore, Goa and Mumbai.  The southern stretch connects to Cochin and Trivandrum.  The eastern Highway going through Kuttiady connects to Mananthavady, Mysore and Bangalore. The nearest airports are at Kannur and Kozhikode.  The nearest railway station is at Vatakara.

Sources
 Kunjali Marakkar
https://web.archive.org/web/20090926051348/http://www.qu.edu.qa/offices/hr/sections/recruitment.php
https://web.archive.org/web/20110716102812/http://www.qu.edu.qa/offices/procurement/contacts.php
http://wikimapia.org/1759899/Vidyaprakash-Public-School

References

 Kunjali Marakkar
https://web.archive.org/web/20090926051348/http://www.qu.edu.qa/offices/hr/sections/recruitment.php
https://web.archive.org/web/20110716102812/http://www.qu.edu.qa/offices/procurement/contacts.php
http://wikimapia.org/1759899/Vidyaprakash-Public-School

External links
https://web.archive.org/web/20090926051348/http://www.qu.edu.qa/offices/hr/sections/recruitment.php

Villages in Kozhikode district
Vatakara area